Nicolas Verdonck (born 5 December 1985) is a Belgian racing driver. He was born in Brussels.

Career

Formula Renault
Verdonck competed in Formula Renault 1600 in 2003, his first year in single seaters. His race engineer was Tim Wright.

Formula 3000
Verdonck rose to prominence when he competed in the 2004 International Formula 3000 season with the Astromega team. Although the step up in power and downforce from FRenault to F3000 is a big one, Verdonck was given a degree of stability by the fact that he kept Wright as his race engineer. However, he only scored one point, which was not enough to get him a drive in the new GP2 Series for 2005. After his home race at Circuit de Spa-Francorchamps, he won a competition for the best driving style.

Formula Three
Verdonck took a step back in 2005, competing part-time in the Formula Three Euroseries without scoring any points. He also took part in the Masters of Formula 3 race. In 2006, he competed in two races in the Spanish Formula Three series, and then moved to the German Formula Three Championship for 2007, where he finished third overall. He moved country again in 2008, driving in the Italian Formula Three Championship.

Formula Le Mans Cup
For 2009, Verdonck switched disciplines to sports car racing by competing in the inaugural season of the Formula Le Mans Cup.  He shared a DAMS-run car with Gavin Cronje and won the drivers' championship.

Racing record

Complete International Formula 3000 results
(key) (Races in bold indicate pole position; races in italics indicate fastest lap.)

Complete GT1 World Championship results

References

External links
 
 

1985 births
Living people
Racing drivers from Brussels
Belgian racing drivers
Formula 3 Euro Series drivers
Euroformula Open Championship drivers
Italian Formula Three Championship drivers
German Formula Three Championship drivers
International Formula 3000 drivers
FIA GT1 World Championship drivers
Porsche Supercup drivers
Blancpain Endurance Series drivers
European Le Mans Series drivers
ADAC GT Masters drivers
24 Hours of Spa drivers
24H Series drivers

FIA Motorsport Games drivers
Toyota Gazoo Racing drivers
Abt Sportsline drivers
Oreca drivers
Team Astromega drivers
RP Motorsport drivers
Phoenix Racing drivers
DAMS drivers
Nürburgring 24 Hours drivers
Boutsen Ginion Racing drivers
GT4 European Series drivers
Hyundai Motorsport drivers